1980-81 was the sixth season that Division 1 operated as the second tier of ice hockey in Sweden, below the top-flight Elitserien (now the SHL).

Division 1 was divided into four starting groups, based on geography. The top four teams in the group would continue to the playoffs to determine which clubs would participate in the qualifier for promotion to Elitserien. The bottom  team in each group was relegated directly to Division 2 for the 1981–82 season. The second-to-last place team in each group played in a relegation series to determine their participation in the next season.

Regular season

Northern Group

Western Group

Eastern Group

Southern Group

Playoffs

First round 
 Kiruna AIF - Malungs IF 2:0 (5:2, 5:2)
 Bodens BK - Strömsbro IF 1:2 (8:7, 4:7, 1:10)
 Almtuna IS - IFK Bäcken 0:2 (4:5, 3:6)
 IF Troja - Bofors IK 2:0 (9:3, 6:4)

Second round 
 Timrå IK - Strömsbro IF 2:1 (12:1, 3:4 OT, 12:3)
 IF Troja - Hammarby IF 1:2 (2:6, 2:0, 4:10)
 Mora IK - Kiruna AIF 2:1 (6:2, 2:11, 8:3)
 HV71 - IFK Bäcken 2:1 (5:2, 5:6 OT, 8:3)
 Luleå HF - Västerås IK 2:1 (10:4, 3:6, 6:5)
 Örebro IK - Tingsryds AIF 2:0 (5:3, 10:2)

Third round 
 Örebro IK - Timrå IK 0:2 (5:6, 4:8)
 Luleå HF - HV71 1:2 (3:2, 3:11, 3:5)
 Hammarby IF - Mora IK 2:0 (3:1, 5:2)

Elitserien promotion

External links
Historical Division 1 statistics on Svenskhockey.com

Swedish Division I seasons
2
Swe